Superforce may refer to:
 A single, unified force in a Theory of everything/unified field theory or Grand unification theory.
 Superforce, a book by Paul Davies on the search for a single, unified force.
 Superforce, a central concept developed by Malachi Martin in his book The Keys of This Blood
 Super Force, a 1990s SciFi TV series about a vigilante cop in powered Armour.